The men's discus throw event at the 1976 Summer Olympics in Montreal, Quebec, Canada had an entry list of 30 competitors from 20 nations, with two qualifying groups (30 jumpers) before the final (15) took place on Sunday July 25, 1976. The maximum number of athletes per nation had been set at 3 since the 1930 Olympic Congress. The top twelve and ties, and all those reaching 60.00 metres advanced to the final. The qualification round was held in Saturday July 24, 1976. The event was won by Mac Wilkins of the United States, the nation's 13th victory in the men's discus throw. Wolfgang Schmidt took silver, matching East Germany's best result to date in the event. John Powell gave the United States a second medal in the competition with his bronze. Czechoslovakia's three-Games medal streak, all won by Ludvík Daněk, ended as Daněk finished ninth; the American streak reached 18 Games.

Background

This was the 18th appearance of the event, which is one of 12 athletics events to have been held at every Summer Olympics. Returning finalists from the 1972 Games were returning champion and three-time medalist Ludvík Daněk of Czechoslovakia, silver medalist (and three-time finalist) Jay Silvester of the United States, bronze medalist Ricky Bruch of Sweden, fourth-place finisher John Powell of the United States, seventh-place finisher (and 1968 finalist) Ferenc Tégla of Hungary, ninth-place finisher Pentti Kahma of Finland, and tenth-place finisher Silvano Simeon of Italy. Powell had been the best discus thrower in 1975, including breaking the world record, but countryman and rival Mac Wilkins rose to prominence in early 1976—setting a new world record in April and bettering it three times in one meet in May, breaking the 70 metres mark for the first time. Wolfgang Schmidt of East Germany was the strongest challenger to the Americans.

Senegal made its debut in the men's discus throw. The United States made its 18th appearance, having competed in every edition of the Olympic men's discus throw to date.

Competition format

The competition used the two-round format introduced in 1936, with the qualifying round completely separate from the divided final. In qualifying, each athlete received three attempts; those recording a mark of at least 60.00 metres advanced to the final. If fewer than 12 athletes achieved that distance, the top 12 would advance. The results of the qualifying round were then ignored. Finalists received three throws each, with the top eight competitors receiving an additional three attempts. The best distance among those six throws counted.

Records

Prior to the competition, the existing world and Olympic records were as follows.

Mac Wilkins had a qualifying round throw of 68.28 metres to break the Olympic record. Nobody, including Wilkins, was able to better that in the final, though all three medalists finished better than the old record.

Schedule

All times are Eastern Daylight Time (UTC-4)

Results

Qualifying

Final

References

External links
  Results

T
Discus throw at the Olympics
Men's events at the 1976 Summer Olympics